Karl Fryksdal (22 June 1885 – 9 April 1944) was a Swedish athlete.  He competed at the 1908 Summer Olympics in London. In the 100 metres, Fryksdal took third place in his first round heat and did not advance to the semifinals.

References

Sources

External links

1885 births
1944 deaths
Athletes (track and field) at the 1908 Summer Olympics
Olympic athletes of Sweden
Swedish male sprinters
20th-century Swedish people